Haubrich is a surname. Notable people with the surname include:

Josef Haubrich (1889–1961), German lawyer and art collector
Joseph G. Haubrich (born 1958), American economist
József Haubrich (1883–1939), Hungarian politician
Tess Haubrich (born 1990), Australian actress

See also
Hubrich

Surnames from given names